Chiryapchi (Çirepçi) is a rural locality (a selo) in Bert-Usovsky Rural Okrug of Ust-Aldansky District in the Sakha Republic, Russia, located  from Borogontsy, the administrative center of the district and  from Syrdakh, the administrative center of the rural okrug. Its population as of the 2002 Census was 8.

References

Notes

Sources
Official website of the Sakha Republic. Registry of the Administrative-Territorial Divisions of the Sakha Republic. Ust-Aldansky District. 

Rural localities in Ust-Aldansky District